The Archaeological Museum of Olynthos opened in July 1998 in a building on the archaeological site of ancient Olynthos, 5 km from Moudania, Halkidiki in Central Macedonia, Greece.

The excavational finds are in the Archaeological Museum of Polygyros. The Olynthos Museum has only audio-visual material, the purpose of which is to give visitors a picture of the archaeological site of Olynthos, starting with the history of the city and moving on to a description of the excavation and the restoration.

Visitors learn that the city was built to a Hippodamean plan (two wide avenues with insulae containing ten (square) houses, and a sewage pipe every five houses). An Olynthian house took the form of a pastas (a square, two-story dwelling with rooms giving onto a covered inner courtyard) and was built of river stones and clay, with the superstructure being of unbaked bricks reinforced with a timber framework. In most of the houses, the floor was of compacted earth, but four have mosaic floors made with river pebbles and mortar.

Photographs and texts describe the domestic organisation (preparation of food, storage of foodstuffs, weaving) and the economic life of the city (stonework, koroplastics, agricultural activities, recreation, symposia).

Visitors also learn about the course of the excavations, from Robinson's work in 1928 to the excavations of 1990 and 1992.

Sources
 

Olynthos
Museums established in 1998